Shohrat Agamyradovich Soyunov (born 8 March 1992) is a Turkmen professional footballer currently playing for FC Ahal in the Ýokary Liga. He is member of the Turkmenistan national team. He plays as a centre-back.

Career

Club
He began his career at HTTU Aşgabat. With team won the 2014 AFC President's Cup.
 
In 2015, he moved to the FC Altyn Asyr. In 2016, he was recognized as the best player in the championship of Turkmenistan.

In 2019, he signed contract with FC Ahal.

In 2020 he moved to the championship of Malaysia. This is his first foreign club in his career. On 1 March 2020, Soyunov made his debut in the 2020 Malaysia Super League in a 0–0 draw against Sabah FA.

On 30 March 2021, it was announced that Söýünow signed a deal with FC Ahal, moving on a free transfer.

International
Soyunov made his senior national team debut on 23 March 2011, in an 2012 AFC Challenge Cup qualification match against Taiwan.

He played for Turkmenistan U22 in 2013 Commonwealth of Independent States Cup.

Career statistics

International

Statistics accurate as of match played 26 March 2017

Honors
Turkmenistan
AFC Challenge Cup: Runners-up 2012
FC HTTU
AFC President's Cup: 2014
FC Altyn Asyr
 Ýokary Liga: 2015, 2016, 2017, 2018

References

External links
 

1992 births
Living people
FC Altyn Asyr players
FC Ahal players
Turkmenistan footballers
Turkmenistan international footballers
Association football defenders
Footballers at the 2010 Asian Games
Asian Games competitors for Turkmenistan
Expatriate footballers in Malaysia
Turkmenistan expatriate sportspeople in Malaysia